Chester Mathis is an American chemist who is currently the Distinguished Professor of Radiology at University of Pittsburgh and holds the UPMC Endowed Chair of PET Research.

He is known for is work with William E. Klunk on a PET radiotracer for imaging amyloid, a protein linked to neurodegenerative diseases including Alzheimer’s. His efforts led to the creation of a novel category of high-efficacy radiopharmaceutical agents, for example Pittsburgh Compound-B (PiB), which can be used to assess beta-amyloid in the living human brain using PET scanning, and which is a fluorescent analog of thioflavin T. For his work on Alzheimer's disease he has received the Metlife Foundation Award (2004) and the Potamkin Prize (2008).

References

University of Pittsburgh faculty
University of California, Davis alumni
Year of birth missing (living people)
Living people
21st-century American biologists
20th-century American biologists
Alzheimer's disease researchers